Akbarzadeh is a surname. Notable people with the surname include:

Pejman Akbarzadeh (born 1980), Iranian musician, researcher, journalist, and radio producer
Shahram Akbarzadeh, Australian academic